Book of Rachel is a work of fiction authored by Esther David. The book won India's Sahitya Akademi Award in the year 2010.

Plot 
The main protagonist of the book is an old Jewish widow named Rachel from Bene Israel community who tries to preserve Jewish culinary art and simultaneously tries to protect a local synagogue from local land mafia.

Reception 
In her review, Geeta Doctor wrote for India Today "To most people it would consist one portion of R. K. Narayan [and] a dash of sentimentality from Tagore's Kabuliwallah."

Deeptha Achar, Professor at the Department of English, Faculty of Arts, Maharaja Sayajirao University of Baroda wrote "...the book is more ambitious. It not only portrays the community [Bene Israel] from within but also examines the pushes and pulls, economic, cultural, which impinge upon it."

Awards 
 Sahitya Akademi Award 2010

References 

2007 fiction books
Sahitya Akademi Award-winning works
Penguin Books India books